Don't Make Me Laugh may refer to:

 "Don't Make Me Laugh", a song by Gomez from the 2006 album How We Operate
 Don't Make Me Laugh, a trilogy of one-act plays performed by Gene Wilder at the Westport Country Playhouse in 2001
 Don't Make Me Laugh, a two-series stand-up comedy show on BBC Radio 4, hosted by David Baddiel from 2014 to 2016